The 2014 Minnesota Swarm season was the tenth season of the Minnesota Swarm, a lacrosse team based in Saint Paul, Minnesota playing in the National Lacrosse League.

Regular season

Current standings

Game log

Roster

Transactions

Trades

See also
2014 NLL season

References

Minnesota Swarm seasons
2014 in lacrosse
Minnesota Swarm